Alex Tillman (born May 29, 1991) is a Canadian football defensive back and punt returner who is currently a free agent. He formerly attended the University of North Dakota and the University of Houston.

High school career 

Tillman attended North Shore Senior High School, where he played high school football as a quarterback. He earned three district championships at North Shore, and was named the Offensive and Team MVP during his senior year with over 2,000 passing yards and 500 rushing yards.

College career 

Tillman first played college football for the Houston Cougars. After redshirting in 2010, he played in 26 games on defense and the special teams from 2011 to 2013. Prior to the 2014 season, Tillman transferred to the University of North Dakota to complete his final year of eligibility. He recorded 31 solo tackles and a 92-yard interception for a touchdown in his final season, playing as a cornerback. He also returned 14 punts for 237 yards, including a school record 95-yard punt return for a touchdown. Tillman was designated an all-conference punt returner in the Big Sky Conference and received an honorable mention as a cornerback.

Professional career 

On May 27, 2015, Tillman was signed by the BC Lions as a free agent. He was among several potential candidates to replace Tim Brown as the team's kickoff returner during the preseason, and was also looked at as a potential punt returner. After making the active roster, Tillman made his CFL debut on July 4 against the Ottawa Redblacks, recording a tackle and returning three punts for 22 yards.

References 

1991 births
Living people
African-American players of American football
African-American players of Canadian football
Canadian football defensive backs
American football defensive backs
American football return specialists
Canadian football return specialists
BC Lions players
Houston Cougars football players
North Dakota Fighting Hawks football players
Players of American football from Houston
Players of Canadian football from Houston
North Shore Senior High School (Texas) alumni
21st-century African-American sportspeople